The Banquet of the Five Kings was a meeting, in 1363, of the kings of England, Scotland, France, Denmark and Cyprus. It was arranged by Sir Henry Picard, a former Lord Mayor of London. The five kings were:

Peter I of Cyprus
Edward III of England
David II of Scotland
John II of France 
Valdemar IV of Denmark

The occasion (the toast of the five kings) was hosted by the Vintners' Company at their hall in the City of London.

The Cypriot beverage company KEO created a brandy, produced in Limassol, to commemorate the occasion.

See also
 List of dining events

References
 Grzegorz Micula, Magdalena Micula (2010) DK Eyewitness Travel Guide: Cyprus, Dorling Kindersley Ltd, pp. 70–71
 The Worhipful Company of Vintners: History of the Hall

1363 in England
1363 in Europe
14th-century diplomatic conferences
Dining events